Rob van den Wildenberg (born 2 March 1982 in Valkenswaard) is a Dutch BMX racer.

Van den Wildenberg reached his first podium spot at a BMX World Cup meeting in the 2005/06 season when he won the bronze medal in Reutlingen. One season later he won a double silver medal in Kampen and in the 2007/08 season he won his second career bronze medal by finishing third in Echichens. He qualified himself for the 2008 Summer Olympics in Beijing.

See also
 List of Dutch Olympic cyclists

References

1982 births
Living people
Dutch male cyclists
BMX riders
Cyclists at the 2008 Summer Olympics
Olympic cyclists of the Netherlands
People from Valkenswaard
Cyclists from North Brabant
20th-century Dutch people
21st-century Dutch people